Sima Ang (died 205 BC) was the ruler of the Kingdom of Yin of the Eighteen Kingdoms during the Chu–Han Contention, an interregnum between the Qin and Han dynasties of China.

Sima Ang was originally a general of the insurgent Zhao kingdom during the Qin dynasty. After the fall of the Qin dynasty in 206 BC, Xiang Yu divided the former Qin Empire into the Eighteen Kingdoms and made Sima Ang the King of Yin (殷王). Sima Ang's kingdom covered parts of present-day northern Henan and southern Hebei provinces, with his capital at Zhaoge (present-day Qi County, Hebi, Henan)

In the third month of 205 BC, the Han general Han Xin conquered the Yin kingdom and captured Sima Ang. Sima Ang surrendered and his kingdom became the Henei Commandery of the Han Empire. Sima Ang died in the following month at the Battle of Pengcheng.

Sima Ang's descendants founded the Jin dynasty (266–420).

References
 

Chu–Han contention people
Chinese nobility
205 BC deaths
Year of birth unknown